He Knows You're Alone is a 1980 American slasher film directed by Armand Mastroianni, written by Scott Parker, and starring Caitlin O'Heaney, Don Scardino, Elizabeth Kemp, Tom Rolfing, and Tom Hanks in his feature film debut. The plot follows a soon-to-be bride who is stalked by a killer the weekend before her wedding.

Filmed in Staten Island, New York in 1979, He Knows You're Alone was released theatrically in the fall of 1980 by Metro-Goldwyn-Mayer/United Artists. Though the film received mostly negative reviews, it was a commercial success for MGM, grossing nearly $5 million at the U.S. box office.

He Knows You're Alone has been credited for being one of the first horror films inspired by the success of Halloween (1978) and shares a number of similarities with the previous hit.

Plot 
A young bride is murdered on her wedding day by the man she rejected for her current fiancé Len Gamble, a detective. Several years later on Long Island, a young bride-to-be named Marie is stabbed to death in a movie theater while her friend Ruthie sits beside her. The killer, Ray Carlton, disappears into the night.

The next morning, Ray arrives at Staten Island, where he observes university student Amy Jensen from a distance. Amy is preparing for her wedding. She sees off her fiancé, Phil, and his friends on their way out of town for a bachelor party before the wedding. After attending a ballet class with her friends Nancy and Joyce, the three run into their philosophy professor Carl, with whom Joyce is having an affair. Amy leaves to go to a dress fitting, stopping to get ice cream on the way, where she notices a man following her. Outside the ice cream shop, she is startled by Marvin, her ex-boyfriend, who is on a break from his job at the local morgue.

Amy stops by the local dress shop for her fitting. Unbeknownst to her, as she leaves, the dressmaker is stabbed to death by Ray with a pair of scissors. Later that night, Nancy and Joyce surprise Amy at her home with a small bachelorette party. Her parents are gone for the weekend, leaving Amy in charge of her kid sister, Diane. Joyce leaves the party for Carl's house, where the two begin to have sex until the power inexplicably goes out. Carl goes to check on the electrical box. When he returns, he is stabbed to death by the killer with a kitchen knife after finding Joyce's lifeless body in the bed.

The following morning, Marvin arrives at Amy's house and insinuates that he wants to rekindle their relationship, and Amy expresses second thoughts over her marriage to Phil. While in the kitchen, Amy sees the mysterious man standing in her yard and becomes frightened. She invites Marvin to come to a local amusement park with her, Nancy, and Diane, but he declines as he has a shift at the morgue that night. Meanwhile, the police find the dressmaker's body at the shop. Detectives Frank Daley and Len Gamble arrive to investigate. Later, Amy and Nancy meet a student named Elliot while jogging through a forest trail. They later attend the amusement park with him, where he questions Amy's claims of a man following her. While riding a dark ride with her sister, Amy sees Ray inside the ride and confides in Nancy at her house that night. Amy briefly leaves to take her sister to a birthday party, leaving Nancy alone at the house. After taking a shower, Nancy puts on a record and lies down in the living room to smoke a joint. Moments later, she has her throat slashed by Ray.

Amy returns and is attacked by Ray after discovering Nancy's severed head in the fish tank. She rushes outside to her car and struggles to drive with Ray on the roof. She crashes the car in a wooded area and runs to the nearby morgue, where she finds Marvin and phones the police. Ray enters the morgue, and Detective Gamble arrives as well. Ray chases Amy through a tunnel system in the morgue's basement. When confronted by Detective Gamble, Ray stabs him in the heart after he gets shot in his left shoulder. Nevertheless, Ray continues to pursue Amy. Amy manages to trap the wounded Ray inside a storage closet and escapes from the basement with Marvin. The two flee outside as the police arrive and enter the morgue.

Later, Marvin and Amy are to be married, implying that she cut off her marriage to Phil. As Amy sits in front of a mirror in her wedding dress, an unseen person enters the room. She stands, approaches the individual and says "Phil, what are you doing here?" before screaming in horror.

Cast

Analysis 
Film scholar John Kenneth Muir notes in his book Horror Films of the 1980s (2010) that, like other slasher films of the period, He Knows You're Alone is structured around an organizing principle, that being a wedding. In this instance, the film follows a format in which the narrative occurs during either a holiday or other important date. Whereas other contemporaneous slasher films, such as Friday the 13th (1980), utilize the summer camp setting as an organizing principle and locale, He Knows You're Alone takes place in various wedding-specific locations, such as a dressmaker's shop, a church, and the bride's home.

Production

Development 
The concept for He Knows You're Alone was developed in 1979 after director Armand Mastroianni pitched an idea for a horror film to producer Edgar Lansbury, based on the urban legend of "The Hook", in which a young couple in a parked car are attacked by a murderer. When Mastroianni realized that Lansbury had little interest in the project during the middle of the pitch, he spontaneously suggested that the aforementioned plot be a self-referential film-within-a-film. This idea piqued Lansbury's interest, after which Mastroianni commissioned Scott Parker to write a screenplay for a slasher film that began with an opening sequence in which two characters watch a horror film in a movie theater, during which one of them is murdered by a serial killer. The film was written under several working titles, including Shriek, The Uninvited, and Blood Wedding.

Casting 
The film marked the first film appearance of actor Tom Hanks, who played a relatively small part. In fact, it was said that Hanks' character was originally written to be killed off with Nancy's character, but because the filmmakers liked him so much, they omitted filming his death scene for the film.

Filming 

The film was originally slated to be shot in Houston, Texas, under executive producer Samuel Z. Arkoff (who had executive-produced other releases from MGM, including The Amityville Horror the previous year), but Arkoff was unable to finance the film, so as a result, it was shot entirely in Staten Island, New York, with half of the original budget.

The film was shot on 35mm over a period of eighteen days in December 1979, with the film's climax being shot at the historic Seaview Hospital in Staten Island. According to director Mastroianni, the entire production from script to final edit took only six months to complete. The shoot was fast-paced and demanding on both the cast and crew, who had to relocate between various locations on a daily basis in order to shoot the entire script. Filming was completed days before Christmas 1979.

Music 
The original music score was composed by Alexander and Mark Peskanov.

Release 
He Knows You're Alone had its world premiere in Los Angeles, California, on August 29, 1980. The film opened in New York City the following month on September 26, showing at several cinemas in Manhattan.

Critical response
The film received mixed to negative reviews, including one by Tom Buckley of The New York Times, citing "uncertain pacing, halting performances and innumerable technical flaws", while praising the performance of male lead Don Scardino. The Boston Globes Michael Blowen faulted the film's script and direction as "slow and strictly second rate", adding "the production values are only slightly better than those in my uncle's home movies". Kevin Thomas of the Los Angeles Times deemed the film a "standard grisly rampaging killer fare...  there are the usual bows to Hitchcock...  but He Knows You're Alone is really no more than just another by-the-numbers piece of sickening trash".

Jack Mathews of the Detroit Free Press wrote: "Rarely has a horror movie worked so hard for so little. There are so many cinematic shock tactics employedtacky eerie music announcing the killer's presence, shadowy forms in the foreground and background, slamming doors, blown light fuses, hands on shoulders etc.that you're numb by the sixth killing". Jimmy Summers of BoxOffice magazine gave the film a negative review, noting: "He Knows You're Alone is another one of those low-budget thrillers that should carry in the credits line: "Based on characters and ideas developed by John Carpenter"". Additionally, Summers noted the lack of on-screen violence as leaving the "more blood-thirsty horror fans feeling cheated". John Dodd of the Edmonton Journal similarly deemed the film "unoriginal and unnecessary" and a "bloody, boring walk down the aisle".

John Herzfeld of The Courier-Journal, however, praised the film's opening film-within-a-film sequence as a "wry twist", concluding: "Despite the incompetent script and some irregular pacing, He Knows You're Alone does deliver a few surprises and some suspense".

The film holds a 30% on Rotten Tomatoes based on 10 reviews

Legacy
The film's opening sequence, featuring a character being murdered in a movie theater auditorium while watching a slasher film, was repeated in Wes Craven's 1997 film Scream 2.

Notes

References

Sources

External links 
 
 

1980 films
1980 directorial debut films
1980 horror films
1980s slasher films
1980 independent films
American independent films
American exploitation films
American serial killer films
American slasher films
Films about stalking
Films directed by Armand Mastroianni
Films set in Staten Island
Films shot in New York City
Home invasions in film
Metro-Goldwyn-Mayer films
Films set in a movie theatre
1980s English-language films
1980s American films